House on Fire may refer to:

 House on Fire (film), a 1986 Japanese film
 House on Fire, an album by Ty Herndon, 2016
 House on Fire, an album by Hembree, 2019
 House on Fire, an EP by Mad Caddies, 2020
 "House on Fire" (Mimi Webb song), 2022
 "House on Fire" (Rise Against song), 2018
 "House on Fire", a song by the Boomtown Rats from V Deep, 1982
 "House on Fire", a song by the Menzingers from After the Party, 2017
 "House on Fire", a song by Sia from This Is Acting, 2016